The ambush near Kaçanik was an incident that occurred on 28 February 1999, during the Kosovo War when Albanian members of the Kosovo Liberation Army (KLA) ambushed a MUP convoy, killing a station commander and wounding four others near the town of Kaçanik. The ambush occurred during a two-day clash between the KLA and the Serbian police.

Ambush
On 27 February 1999, Riza Kika, chief of security at a local limestone factory in Kaçanik was abducted from his home by the KLA. A day later on 28 February, a local police unit under the command of Bogoljub Staletović mounted an operation to release Kika. On route to release him, the police convoy was ambushed by the KLA.

Aftermath 
Up to 3,000 Albanian civilians tried to flee to Macedonia on 28 February to escape a Serbian assault on their homes in the Hani I Elezit area, near Kosovo’s southern border. They got prevented by Serbian Forces which claimed they lacked the necessary papers.

References 

Military operations of the Kosovo War
Battles involving FR Yugoslavia
1999 in Kosovo
Conflicts in 1999
Kosovo Liberation Army